Yaft Abad  (persian : شهر یافت‌آباد)  is an old neighborhood in the southwest of Tehran city, which is located in the 18 district of Tehran Municipality.

This area is famous for having one of the largest furniture markets in Iran (Yaftabad Furniture Market).

Neighbourhoods in Tehran